The Sakhalin Regional Museum of Local Lore, also known as the Sakhalin Regional Museum, is a museum in Yuzhno-Sakhalinsk on the island of Sakhalin, Sakhalin Oblast, Russian Federation. It is the largest-scale museum in the federal subject. The Museum collects, researches, and displays materials relating to the natural history, archaeology, history, and ethnography of the region.

History
The first museum on Sakhalin opened in what was then the military post of Alexandrovsk in North Sakhalin in 1896. A number of exhibits disappeared when the area was in Japanese hands, in 1905 and again between 1920 and 1925. The museum reopened in 1932.

In 1937, the Karafuto Agency Museum reopened to the public in what was then the city of Toyohara [ja], now Yuzhno-Sakhalinsk, with displays organized around the three themes of nature, culture, and industry.

After the Soviet invasion of South Sakhalin in August 1945, the Museum changed hands, reopening to the public the following May; for a period, until their repatriation, Japanese staff continued to work alongside their Soviet colleagues. In 1953, the Museum in Alexandrovsk-Sakhalinsky closed and its collections were transferred to the Sakhalin Regional Museum. In 1970, the Museum staged an exhibition of paintings from the Tretyakov Gallery. (By 2000, there were seven such branch museums; in 2001 these were reestablished as independent museums in their own right.) Since 1990, the Museum has maintained relations with Hokkaido Museum (and its predecessor institution the Historical Museum of Hokkaido) in Sapporo, Japan, including joint research and staff exchanges.

Building

The building has a marked horizontal emphasis, the tenshu-like components provide a strong central accent and give an impression of ascent, while staggered roofs add variety to enliven the façade. While the lower tiers are more western in their inspiration, the cut stone is reminiscent of castle walls, and the white plaster of the upper tiers and onigawara and other decorative features such are thoroughly Japanese. Inside, skylights brighten the upper exhibition spaces with natural light, while cloth wallpaper once softened the acoustic. From 2005, restoration and repair work was carried out on the building.

Collection and display
The permanent display is organized around six main themes: the geology of Sakhalin and the Kuril Islands; their flora and fauna; "ancient cultures and indigenous peoples"; discovery and exploration (from the seventeenth to the nineteenth centuries); "the period of hard labour"; and the first half of the twentieth century. Leading figures documented include Gennady Ivanovich Nevelskoy, Mogami Tokunai, Mamiya Rinzō, Matsuura Takeshirō, Bronisław Piłsudski, and Igor Farkhutdinov, and the local oil and gas industry is also introduced.

The collection includes replicas of local fossil finds, of Nipponosaurus sachalinensis and Desmostylus hesperus; taxidermied representatives of species featured in the Red Data Book of Sakhalin Oblast; materials relating to the Ainu, Nivkh, and Uilta; and one of the four main boundary markers placed in 1906 along the 50th parallel at the time of the demarcation of the Sakhalin frontier following the Treaty of Portsmouth that brought the Russo-Japanese War to its close.

See also

Nemuro City Museum of History and Nature

References

External links
Sakhalin Regional Museum of Local Lore

Local museums in Russia
Buildings and structures in Sakhalin Oblast
Yuzhno-Sakhalinsk
Museums established in 1937
Imperial Crown Style architecture
Tourist attractions in Saratov Oblast
Cultural heritage monuments in Sakhalin Oblast
Culture of Sakhalin Oblast
Objects of cultural heritage of Russia of regional significance